The men's banked slalom competition of the 2022 Winter Paralympics was held at Genting Snow Park on 11 March 2022.

Medal table

Banked slalom SB-LL1

Banked slalom SB-LL2

Banked slalom SB-UL

See also
Snowboarding at the 2022 Winter Olympics

References

Men's banked slalom